Rarities – Volume 3 is a digital-only 20-track compilation by English soprano Sarah Brightman. Tracks on this volume are extracted from the master tapes of the 1995 Fly and 2003 Harem special edition tour CDsCDs, the Voce album (a 2014 release available only in Japan), sessions with Gregorian and other sources. It contains songs and works that were previously released only in Europe and Japan and are now finally made available in all parts of the world.

The album was released on December 18, 2015 and was exclusively available for digital download for a limited time. The set was not available in Japan nor Europe.

An audio commentary track by Sarah and producer Frank Peterson is included.

Track listing

References

2015 compilation albums
Sarah Brightman albums